This is a list of events in the year 2018 in the United States Armed Forces.

Events

December
 December 13
 The United States Navy announces that it will revive the rank of Warrant Officer 1, a rank that had been unused and kept on hiatus since 1975. This rank is being revived specifically to be awarded to six Navy Petty Officers who have been assigned to roles in offensive cyberwarfare.

External links
 US Navy official website

See also
 United States Department of Defense

References

United States Armed Forces